The Kunsthaus Bregenz (KUB) presents temporary exhibitions of international contemporary art in Bregenz, Vorarlberg (Austria).

History 
Commissioned by the State of Vorarlberg and designed by the Swiss architect Peter Zumthor, the Kunsthaus Bregenz was built between 1990 and 1997. The KUB opened in July 1997 with an exhibition by the American artist James Turrell.

Edelbert Köb, founding director (1997–2000) of the Kunsthaus Bregenz, was succeeded by Eckhard Schneider (2000–2008) and Yilmaz Dziewior (2009–2015). Rudolf Sagmeister was the curator for 30 years (1992–2022). Thomas D. Trummer has been director of the Kunsthaus Bregenz since May 1, 2015.

For the celebration of its 25th anniversary, the KUB organised an exhibition at the Biennale in Venice from April 20 to July 4, 2022.

Architecture 

The Kunsthaus Bregenz was designed by the Swiss architect Peter Zumthor, 2009 Pritzker Architecture Prize laureate, and winner of the Mies van der Rohe Award for European Architecture in 1998. The KUB has since received numerous distinctions for its method of construction. One of the major modern art galleries worldwide, it is a fine example of architectural minimalism. Distinguished by its imposing external form and unwavering spatial concept, the building was conceived as a daylight museum. Swiss architect Peter Zumthor's design, in his own words, aimed at fulfilling an art gallery’s chief function: to be a place for art and a place where people can peacefully encounter art. For artists exhibiting at the KUB, the architecture is a measure and conceptual stimulus for their projects, especially when entire new series of works are being produced. The architecture is an indispensable platform for the KUB's international exhibition program.

Location 
The KUB is a prominent solitary construction in downtown Bregenz near the vorarlberg museum and Vorarlberger Landestheater and not far from the lakefront. Together with the Landestheater it frames an open square between the old town and the lake.

Façade 

The façade consists of 912 finely etched equally sized glass panels weighing some 250 kg each, secured by clips to a steel framework. These panels form a free-standing, light-diffusing skin, independent of the actual building, that serves to initially refract the incident daylight and conduct it to the light ceilings in the exhibition halls. At dark, the artificial lighting from the interior shines through inner light bands and outer skin to show the building's interior life. The gap between light skin and building accommodates servicing equipment. Artists exhibiting at the KUB have sometimes made use of the façade in their installations.

Interior 
Materials distinguish the interior, with exposed unpainted concrete visibly dominating. The floors and stairways are of polished terrazzo, the walls and ceilings of exposed unpolished concrete. The ground floor accommodates foyer, checkroom, cashier's desk, and catalogue sales, although most of its almost 500 m2 is used as a multifunctional exhibiting space for KUB Arena projects. Aside from its etched glass outer walls, three differently positioned concrete wall-slabs are visible on the ground floor. These support the Kunsthaus floors and ceilings, structuring the exhibition space on all three upper stories and dividing it from the main stairways, emergency exits, and passenger and freight elevators. Uniformly positioned entrances and exits structure a route through ground floor and upper stories. The latter differ only in ceiling height; each can be used as one large space or scaled down by means of mobile partitions, depending on the project. All three upper stories are top-lit. The ceilings of the exhibition spaces are of loosely joined glass panels. Incident light enters the building on all four sides through light bands and is distributed through the interior volume of each story by the glass ceiling panels. Artificial lighting in the cavity above the glass ceilings complements or replaces daylight as required. These light sources are not visible. The ground and three upper stories and their material and formal aesthetic make up a unity with great potential for art installations. Two subterranean levels complete the spatial program. The first, supplied with daylight by a light pit, accommodates a lecture room, the museum educational center, and sanitary rooms, separated from the non public areas (stock, maintenance, personnel rooms) by translucent glass brick walls. The second subterranean level is closed to the public. It accommodates an originals archive and storage space as well as the electrical, heating, and climate controls.

Administration building, café 
The KUB administration building is set a short way off from the town side of the Kunsthaus, its black façade directed at the front of the Kunsthaus and its entrance. It acts as a transitional structure to the smaller and low buildings of the old part of the town. In addition to administration offices, the ground floor houses the KUB café. Peter Zumthor has displayed his uncompromising architectural vision here again, café, bar area, and kitchen being faced with black exposed concrete. In separating these amenities indispensable to a modern art gallery from the art exhibiting building, the latter can devote itself to its primary purpose.

KUB collection showcase 
The Kunsthaus Bregenz has its own collection. One of the largest groups of works in the collection consists of architectural models by Peter Zumthor. Some of these exhibits have been archived since the architect's solo exhibition in 2007. Further models have been and are still being added to the collection as permanent loans. Buildings and projects that were realized as well as those that remained in the design stage are on show. The variety displayed in the exhibition demonstrates the outstanding role that working with models and materials such as wood, metal, or clay plays in Peter Zumthor's studio.

Exhibitions 
The Kunsthaus Bregenz is one of Europe’s leading galleries for contemporary art both architecturally and in terms of its program. The Kunsthaus exhibits works by international contemporary artists who generally create art work specifically for the Kunsthaus. The KUB also has its own collection with two core areas: “Archive Art Architecture” and “Contemporary Austrian Art.” Select works of exhibiting artists have been expanding the latter part of the collection since 2009.

The KUB not only addresses international concerns with its exhibitions and projects, but also helps shape the cultural identity of Vorarlberg with regional projects. Noteworthy examples are Gottfried Bechtold's “Signatur 02” at the Silvretta dam, the American artist Jenny Holzer’s “Truth Before Power” (2004), involving the projection of large-format texts onto architectural and natural monuments in Vorarlberg, from August 2010 through April 2012, the British sculptor Antony Gormley’s landscape project “Horizon Field”, or, in Winter of 2019, the large-scale facade project "KUNSTHAUS" by artist Anne Marie Jehle.

Apart from extensive and prestigious shows in its main exhibition spaces, the KUB also ran projects with a processual and interdisciplinary bias in the KUB Arena on the ground floor, or projects at the KUB Basement.

Alongside its exhibitions, the Kunsthaus offers an extensive educational program and a vast variety of events.The Kunsthaus Bregenz publishes work-relevant books, collections of essays, and catalogues, often in close collaboration with exhibiting artists and designers such as Walter Nikkels or Stefan Sagmeister. Exclusive special editions for the Kunsthaus Bregenz are an outcome of the close collaboration between artists and their exhibition production.

List of exhibitions

Further reading 
 Zumthor, Peter: Kunsthaus Bregenz In: Kunsthaus Bregenz (Hrsg.): Archiv Kunst Architektur Hatje Cantz Verlag, 1997,(Werkdokumente/Kunsthaus Bregenz.).

See also 

 List of museums in Vorarlberg

References 

https://web.archive.org/web/20110724004155/http://www.phantomspeisung.net/index.php?title=kunsthaus_bregenz_arch_peter_zumthor_1997&more=1&c=1&tb=1&pb=1

External links 

 
 Kunsthaus Bregenz (Architekt: Peter Zumthor, 1997)

Art museums and galleries in Austria
Bregenz
Museums in Vorarlberg
Art museums established in 1997
1997 establishments in Austria
20th-century architecture in Austria